Tatiana Mikhailovna Troepolskaya (1744–1774) was a Russian stage actress and opera soprano. She is known as one of the first professional actresses in Russia.

She made her debut in Moscow in 1757, and was engaged at the Imperial Theatre in St Petersburg, where she became one of the leading stars alongside her spouse Vasily Alekseevich Troepolsky (1737–1800). She was foremost known for her roles in tragedies, and her most famed role was arguably the female lead of the Russian tragedy by Sumarokov, "Mstislav".

References 
 Сумароков П. И. О Российском театре, от начала оного до конца царствования Екатерины II. // «Отечественные записки». — 1822, № 32; 1823, № 35.

1744 births
1774 deaths
18th-century actresses from the Russian Empire
18th-century women opera singers from the Russian Empire